The Ilha Solteira Dam is an embankment dam on the Paraná River near Ilha Solteira in São Paulo, Brazil. It was constructed between 1967 and 1973 for hydroelectric power production, flood control and navigation.

The power plant contains 20 generators with Francis turbines that are broken down into three ratings: 11 X , 5 X  and 4 X . In 2005, the power plant produced 17.9 TWh of electricity.

See also

 List of power stations in Brazil

References

Dams completed in 1973
Energy infrastructure completed in 1973
Hydroelectric power stations in Brazil
Dams in São Paulo (state)
Dams on the Paraná River
Embankment dams